Barrachnie is a place in Glasgow, Scotland adjacent to Garrowhill.

History
It was an ancient fermtoun which was mentioned in the Glasgow Protocols and had many entries in the rental book of the Bishopric of Glasgow in the Middle Ages - . Like the other parts of the district it was part of the Barony and Regality of Glasgow and from about 1600, also of the parish of Old Monkland.

The first coal mined in the Baillieston district was in the Barrachnie pit.

The etymology of the name is not easy as it has appeared under many configurations and its evolution to the present form is difficult to understand as it is pronounced "Brachney" - just as it was in the 15th. century.

Transport
It is served by Garrowhill railway station and three bus services to the city and Lanarkshire.

References

The Rental book of the Barony of Glasgow

Areas of Glasgow
Baillieston